Qushkhaneh-ye Pain Rural District is a rural district (dehestan) in Qushkhaneh District, Shirvan County, North Khorasan Province, Iran. At the 2006 census, its population was 5,771, in 1,194 families.  The rural district has 10 villages.

References 

Rural Districts of North Khorasan Province
Shirvan County